Ambodiriana is a rural commune in the district of Toamasina II (district), in the region of Atsinanana, on the east coast of Madagascar.

Economy
The economy is based on agriculture. Rice, manioc & corn are grown, other crops are lychee, cloves, cacao, coffee, papaya, banana and sugar cane.

Rivers
Two rivers cross the municipality: Ivoloina and Ifontsy.

Nature
 The Betampona Reserve is partly located in this municipality.

References

Populated places in Atsinanana